The Last Kids on Earth is a children's illustrated novel and subsequent book series by American author Max Brallier, illustrated by Douglas Holgate, with audiobook format narrated by Robbie Daymond. Novels in the series have been recognized on Best Seller lists of both The New York Times and USA Today. This book is recommended for teens/pre-teens in the "middle school" demographic. The series currently includes 7 books, with an 8th underway, and has been adapted into an animated series by Netflix.

In the initial story, a foster child and an optimistic loner named Jack Sullivan finds himself abandoned in a cartoonish end-of-the-world apocalypse. He thrives on freedom, junk food, and video games while building a team of his classmates to fight off zombies as well as a trove of campy monsters who have also somehow appeared. The series treats its subject matter with lighthearted humor rather than adult horror.

Subsequent books continue the same comic dystopian scenario with the team of mismatched school kids facing new antagonists, new monsters and new challenges.

List of novels
 The Last Kids on Earth (2015) #1
 The Last Kids on Earth and the Zombie Parade (2016) #2 
 The Last Kids on Earth and the Nightmare King (2017) #3 
 The Last Kids on Earth and the Cosmic Beyond (2018) #4
 The Last Kids on Earth and the Midnight Blade (2019) #5
 The Last Kids on Earth Survival Guide (2019) (Standalone)
 The Last Kids on Earth: June's Wild Flight (2020) (Standalone)
 The Last Kids on Earth and the Skeleton Road (2020) #6
 The Last Kids on Earth: Thrilling Tales From the Tree House (2021) (Standalone)
 The Last Kids on Earth and the Doomsday Race (2021) #7
 The Last Kids on Earth: Quint and Dirk's Hero Quest (2022) (Standalone)
 The Last Kids on Earth and the Forbidden Fortress (2022) #8

Summary
The eight books follow a thirteen-year-old boy named Jack Sullivan, who lives in his foster brother's tree house after a zombie outbreak hits his hometown, Wakefield, Massachusetts. He is accompanied by his best friend Quint Baker, who loves experimenting; June Del Toro, a strong, brave girl who used to be the school newspaper's editor-in-chief; and Dirk Savage, the local bully with exceptional fighting skills. The friends fight one monster in each book, while trying to stay alive, and stop an entity named Rezzoch, who wants to take over the Earth.

Reception
The series is recognized as a best–seller on both The New York Times and USA Today book lists, with the publisher boasting seven million copies in print.

Animated series adaptation 

On February 26, 2018, it was announced that Netflix had a series order to an animated television adaptation of the book series. The first season, a single hour–long special covering the plot of the first book, was released in September 2019 to coincide with the release of the fifth novel. The second season, covering the plot of the second book, was released in April 2020 and consists of ten episodes. Production companies involved in the series include Thunderbird Entertainment's animation studio Atomic Cartoons. It has recently been renewed for a third season based on the third book in the series, it was released on October 16, 2020. A 4th season was hinted at the end of season 3 but there has not been any official confirmation by Netflix yet. However, a screenshot of a message by Max Brallier reveals that it was cancelled during the pandemic, but he is working on a live action version.

References

Further reading 
 
 
 

Book series introduced in 2015
Series of children's books
Viking Press books
Apocalyptic novels
Comedy novels